The 2008–09 Liga III season was the 53rd season of Liga III, the third tier of the Romanian football league system.

The winners of each division got promoted to the 2009–10 Liga II season. There were also two playoff tournaments held at neutral venues involving the second placed teams, one with those from series 1, 2 and 3, the other with those from series 4, 5, and 6. The winners of the playoffs also got promoted to the 2009–10 Liga II season.
The bottom three from each division were relegated at the end of the season to the Liga IV. From the 15th placed teams, another three were relegated. To determine these teams, separate standings were computed, using only the games played against clubs ranked 1st through 14th.

Standings

Seria I

Seria II

Seria III

Seria IV

Seria V

Seria VI

Playoffs

Group 1 

 10 June 2009 – Municipal Stadium – Oţelul II Galaţi – Tricolorul Breaza 0-3
 13 June 2009 – Municipal Stadium – Tricolorul Breaza – CS Ovidiu 3-1
 17 June 2009 – Municipal Stadium – CS Ovidiu – Oţelul II Galaţi 1-3
 Tricolorul Breaza Promoted

Group 2 

 10 June 2009 – Cetate Stadium – FC Caracal – Silvania Şimleu Silvaniei 0-2
 13 June 2009 – Cetate Stadium – Silvania Şimleu Silvaniei – CS Ineu  3-1
 17 June 2009 – Cetate Stadium – FC Caracal – CS Ineu Cancelled
 Silvania Şimleu Silvaniei Promoted

See also 

 2008–09 Liga I
 2008–09 Liga II
 2008–09 Liga IV

Liga III seasons
3
Romania